Operation Cobra's Anger was a US-led offensive in Helmand province in southern Afghanistan. About 1,000 Marines 150 Afghan troops were involved, as well as a Danish armor attachment. The operation began in the early hours of December 4th, 2009. The goal of the operation was to disrupt Taliban supply and communications lines in the strategic Now Zad valley of Helmand province. Also, to reopen the strategic coalition supply lines, leading into FOB Cafferetta, a USMC/ANA outpost, which was under siege by the Taliban, and could only be accessed by air.

Operation
The operation began on 4 December 2009, when some 300 Marines from the 3rd Battalion, 4th Marines, and the Marine recon unit, Task Force Raider, dropped into the Now Zad valley via Sikorsky CH-53E Super Stallion helicopters and Bell Boeing V-22 Osprey aircraft. This was the first time the Osprey were used in combat operations in Afghanistan, as well as the newly implemented M1150 Assault Breacher Vehicle. There was a Danish armor attachment that took part in the operation as well. Throughout the recent years, the Taliban planted thousands of homemade bombs, and dug in positions throughout the valley, in preparation for defense against coalition forces, that have been in this region since the early days of OEF. This area is located at the foot of the craggy Tangee Mountains.

By the end of the third day of the operation, no major resistance had been encountered.

References

Military operations of the War in Afghanistan (2001–2021) involving the United States
Conflicts in 2009
Battles of the War in Afghanistan (2001–2021)
2009 in Afghanistan
United States Marine Corps in the War in Afghanistan (2001–2021)